The Mamiya C series is a line of twin-lens reflex medium-format system cameras manufactured by Mamiya between 1956 and 1994.  It was developed from the Mamiyaflex series of cameras built from 1949 to 1956.  The Mamiya C series was initially aimed at the professional market, but some later models were intended for amateurs.

Common features
Unlike most TLR cameras, the Mamiya C has interchangeable lenses.  The upper and lower lenses come off as a unit, and are available in at least seven different focal lengths.  The lower lens of each unit has an aperture diaphragm as well as a leaf shutter.  A flash sync terminal is part of the lens unit, and the delay can be set to M or X mode.  The camera has an interlocking baffle that enables lenses to be changed without exposing the film.

Focusing is performed via a bellows system on the front side of the camera.  Early models had separate film advance and shutter cocking mechanisms; on later models the shutter was automatically cocked as the film was advanced.  There is no metering in the camera body, so an external light meter is necessary; later models were compatible with optional accessory viewfinders that had built-in meters.

Models

While the basic shape remained the same, the bodies increased with size over time.  Two of the early models were branded with "Mamiyaflex" on the nameplate attached to the viewfinder; all of the other C series cameras were branded with "Mamiya". The first in the C series, the Mamiyaflex C, was introduced in 1957 as a follow-on to the earlier Mamiyaflex line, which had included the Automat A (1949) and Automat B (1954); the primary innovation of the C was the introduction of an interchangeable lens mount. The Mamiyaflex C was accompanied with 80mm, 105mm, and 135mm lenses. The C2 was introduced in June 1958 and is distinguished from its predecessor with a second focusing knob on the left side of the camera. In addition, two more lenses (65mm, 180mm) joined the line.

The "Mamiyaflex" name was dropped for "Mamiya" when the C3 was introduced in February 1962; the C3 featured updated styling, adding the name above the lens mount and switching to a gray leather body covering. At this time, the lenses used a new shutter mechanism with a faster minimum speed. The C3 also moved to a crank for film advance, speeding up camera operation.

The line was split in the mid-1960s with the C33 (April 1965) and C22 (March 1966) models. C22 was aimed at amateurs and had fewer features, which also made it lighter than the C33, which were intended for professionals. The main distinguishing feature was the C33 had more automated operation, where winding the film also cocked the shutter automatically; the C22 required two separate actions. Both were the first Mamiya C TLRs that were able to use 220 film, but a different back was required.

The C220 (April 1968) and C330 (October 1969) models were developed from the C22 and C33, respectively, with updated styling (the prominent nameplate now had chrome lettering on black) and a built-in switchable pressure plate to enable the use of 220 film. Weight was reduced as well. The final two lenses (55mm and 250mm) also were introduced at about this time.

The later C330f, C220f, and C330S were refined versions of their respective base cameras, and carried the letter annotation on a nameplate below the lens mount. One of the changes from the C330 to the C330f, for example, was the inclusion of a focusing track lock on the latter.

Notes

Lenses
Lenses for the Mamiya C series have been grouped by users into three different series based on the shutter model and the color of the shutter housing: first chrome, second chrome, and black.  Most lenses can be used on most bodies, but some combinations won't allow for automatic shutter cocking.  The first chrome series had Seikosha-MX shutters with speeds from 1 s to  s.  The second chrome series had Seikosha-S shutters with speeds from 1 s to  s, plus Bulb.  A few chrome shutter lens had a Seikosha-SLV shutter.  The black series had Seiko shutters, except for the 80 mm 3.7 lens, which had a Copal shutter.

Notes

Accessories

The Mamiya C series were marketed as system cameras, and over time a wide array of accessories were offered.  Not all accessories are fully compatible with all camera bodies.

 Viewfinders - Magnifying hood, CdS finder, Porrofinder, CdS Porrofinder, Prism finder
 Viewfinder masks - for 105 mm, 136 mm, 180 mm, and 250 mm lenses
 Focusing screens - matte, crosshair, checker, rangefinder spot, microprism
 Pistol grips - bottom-mounted
 Grips - side-mounted
 Flashgun bracket
 Flashgun Pro Deluxe II
 Paramender - special tripod mount that helps with parallax issues
 Single-exposure back - for cut film and plates; three different models over time
 Lens hoods, cases, tripod quick releases, etc.

See also
 List of Mamiya products

References

External links
 6x6 cameras at the Mamiya Camera Museum
 Mamiya C page at Camera-wiki.org

C
120 film cameras